The Stoeger Prize from the Chamber Music Society of Lincoln Center is an international music prize for composers of chamber music. The US$25,000 cash award is given every two years in recognition of significant contributions to the chamber music repertory. The money was donated by Milan Stoeger, a psychoanalyst and a long-time subscriber to the Chamber Music Society, in honor of his wife. The Elise L. Stoeger Prize was established in 1987.

Winners

 1987 Gunther Schuller
 1990 Oliver Knussen
 1992 Lee Hyla and Olly Wilson
 1993 Aaron Jay Kernis and Nicholas Maw
 1994 Oleg Felzer and Richard Wilson
 1995 David Liptak and Steven Mackey
 1996 Martin Bresnick and Osvaldo Golijov
 1997 Stephen Hartke and Judith Weir
 1998 Thomas Ades and Yehudi Wyner
 1999 James Primosch and Scott Wheeler
 2000 Michael Daugherty and Kaija Saariaho
 2002 Chen Yi
 2004 David Rakowski
 2006 Pierre Jalbert
 2008 Jörg Widmann
 2010 Brett Dean
 2012 Zhou Long
 2014 Thomas Larcher
 2016 Huw Watkins
 2018 Marc-André Dalbavie
 2022 David Serkin Ludwig

References

External links
 

American music awards
Classical music awards
Awards established in 1987